Everdien Flora Lagerwerf-Vergunst (born 23 May 1964 in Ede) is a Dutch judge and former politician and educator. As a member of the ChristianUnion (ChristenUnie) she was a member of the Senate from 2007 to 2011.

Lagerwerf-Vergunst studied law at Erasmus University Rotterdam. She lives in Ridderkerk, where she was politically active for the Reformatory Political Federation, a predecessor of the ChristianUnion. She is a member of the Protestant Church in the Netherlands, of which her father is a minister.

References 
  Parlement.com biography

1964 births
Living people
Christian Union (Netherlands) politicians
21st-century Dutch politicians
Dutch educators
Dutch women educators
20th-century Dutch judges
Erasmus University Rotterdam alumni
Academic staff of Leiden University
Members of the Senate (Netherlands)
People from Ede, Netherlands
People from Ridderkerk
Protestant Church Christians from the Netherlands
Reformatory Political Federation politicians
Academic staff of Tilburg University
21st-century Dutch women politicians
21st-century Dutch judges